The Frogman is a high-end model of the Casio G-Shock line of watches. It was one of the first models of the "Master of G" line, a line of G-Shock watches designed for special uses. The Frogman has an asymmetric shape and is attached eccentrically on its straps. It is specially made as a diving watch for scuba divers and is the only ISO 6425-compliant G-Shock line with a 200 m Divers rating.

The first Frogman model (DW-6300) was released in November 1993. While Casio started to use a newer, four-screw back plate for its watches around that time, the DW-6300 retained the older screw-on back plate design. In June 1995, a second generation of the Frogman model was introduced, the DW-8200. From then on the Frogman became very popular among G-Shock collectors and many special editions were started to be introduced.

A unique model in the Frogman lineup is the limited edition MRG-1100-2. This model was part of the MR-G series, a high-end G-Shock line of metal watches. While all other G-Shock models are constructed with resin bezels and straps, the MRG-1100-2 is constructed completely of titanium.

In April 1999, the DW-9900 model was introduced. This Frogman was slightly smaller than the DW-8200. For the next two years, both DW-8200 and DW-9900 models were produced. The DW-9900 seems to have been a less popular model as it was soon followed up with the solar-powered GW-200 models in June 2001. Except for the "Snake Killer" and the "Carbon Fiber Frogman" (GW-201-6JF and GW-201NT-1JF), this Frogman has the Tough Solar 2422 module. The last GW-200 series Frogman is the GW-200Z-1JF "Final Frogman" that was released in November 2009. The model has been around for at least seven years, longer than the DW-8200. Typically, the "GW" designation refers to G-Shocks that can receive time updates from radio signals, which are commonly called, though incorrectly, "atomic signals" But, no Frogman has been equipped with this feature prior to the release of the GWF-1000.

The GWF-1000 was introduced in September 2009 in Japan. It represents the fifth generation of the Frogman series. The GWF-1000 is now capable of receiving time updates from six locations worldwide (Mainflingen [Germany], Anthorn [England], Ft Collins [USA], Shangqiu [China] & Fukushima & Fukuoka/Saga [Japan]), while retaining ISO 6425 200 m water resistance, shock resistance, dive time measurement and solar power. It also incorporates a tide and moon graph function. Like the first generation Frogman, the GWF-1000 employs a stainless steel construction with the addition of diamond-like coating (DLC) to improve corrosion resistance.

Casio launched the model GWF-D1000 at Baselworld 2016. This includes the references GWF-D1000-1 and GWF-D1000B-1 (blue color accents). Besides the usual features such as "Tough Solar" sunlight-powered movement and atomic clock radio signal accuracy control system, the watch has three sensors, namely, temperature, depth gauge, and compass. The watch will log the user's dive time, track the depth, record the water temperature, and log the data for up to 20 dives. Other unique feature is the sapphire crystal.

In 2020 Casio unveiled their first analogue Frogman, the GWF-A1000. The new model features a carbon fibre reinforced resin case with a monocoque design. Further features include Bluetooth connectivity.

References

Casio watches
Products introduced in 1993